Middleground is a Russian-American indie drama film directed and co-written by Alisa Khazanova. The film premiered at the Moscow International Film Festival on 27 June 2017 followed by a release in Russia on 2 November 2017. The film will receive a limited theatrical and VOD release in the United States on 18 May 2018.

Plot
A European woman is stuck in an Upstate hotel where she keeps reliving the same day while slowly drifting away from her preoccupied American husband and towards a mysterious stranger who claims they were in love with each other some time ago.

Cast
 Alisa Khazanova as Woman
 Noah Huntley as Man
 Chris Beetem as Husband
 Rob Campbell as Bartender
 Daniel Raymont as Marcus
 Marisa Ryan as Marcus' Wife
 Adam Davenport as Dinner Guest
 Ari Barkan as Partygoer #2
 Zachary Le Vey as Bill
 Claudio Bellante as James

Reception

Critical response 
Midleground received negative reviews from US critics. The Hollywood Reporter called it "glossily made and ambitious" while noting that its story "would have better odds on stage, where mannered, nearly content-free dialogue might play as a literary device". Filipe Freitas of Film Threat wrote in a review for the film, "Although well acted, mindful, and visually arresting, Middleground runs whimsically loose and exploratory throughout, living essentially from the intensity of its mood".

Critical reception in Russia was much more positive, with Kinopoisk reporting an 88% critical approval rating based on 18 reviews. Mikhail Trofimenkov of Kommersant called Middleground "a brave and surprising film".

References

External links 

2017 drama films
Russian drama films
Films set in hotels
American drama films
English-language Russian films